Joseph (Yoske) Levy is an Israeli artist who focuses mainly in oil paintings and sculptures in wood and aluminum. Levy is known for his semi cubist depiction of human figures in catastrophic situations. His works have been displayed in various Israeli galleries and are part of important collections around the world.

Early Childhood

Joseph (Yoske) Levy was born in Germany in 1927 and immigrated to Israel in 1934. From an early age he demonstrated a love for the arts in general, and for painting in particular. In one of his interviews Levy recalled how his mother encouraged him and his two siblings to paint: "My mother would bring to the table a strawberry, declaring that those who will draw the most beautiful strawberry will be the one to eat it, at the end she gave strawberries for everyone."

When he was six years old the Nazis came to power in Germany. Levy recalled his first experience of Antisemitism in an interview: "Some kids from my class called me 'Jewish pig'," he said. His mother then complained to the teacher about the behavior of the other students, and once the teacher refused to do anything about it as 'the children were right' as the child 'was indeed Jewish', the parents decided to leave Germany.

Youth and Bezalel

In 1934, Levy's family came to Israel and settled in Hadera. His parents did their best to find jobs suitable for their profession as doctors, while young Joseph continued to develop his skills in painting. Joseph studied at the vocational school for mechanics Titch, but wished to dedicate his life to painting. As a young adult, Levy was one of the founders of the Yehiam Kibbutz. In 1950 the Kibbutz decided to send him to study art at Bezalel, the famous art academy situated in Jerusalem. Under the management of Mordecai Ardon Joseph studied various graphic techniques, and developed his artistic skills.

Artistic career

Most of his adult life Levy did art indirectly, "I had to make a living and support my family," he explained. For many years he built models for architects, museums and various institutions, and dreamed of a time when he could devote most of his time to art. In 1992 upon retiring from his job, Levy began painting and sculpting obsessively. "When my health allows me, I work every day," he said. His artistic media are many: drawing and painting, sculpture in various materials: stone, wood, clay, fiberglass and metal castings. He once said that when he has an artistic vision, he would do whatever it takes to see it through, even in mediums which he never tried before. As far as sculpture, in wood and in aluminum, Levy defines himself autodidact. Throughout the years 1992-2006 Levy created few series of sculptures and paintings, mainly focusing in landscapes.

Catastrophe Series

Throughout the years 2006-2010 Levy created sculptures and paintings influenced by apocalyptic visions. The future of the planet and mankind were the main issues concerning the 80 years old artist. Humans became the focus of his attention, and he situated them in helplessness situations, where their lives are endangered without a chance of rescue. Despite the tendency to attribute these works to other Israeli artists' works about the Holocaust, such as Yigal Tumarkin and Moshe Gershuni, Levy had insisted that that series is not about the Holocaust of the Jews. Rather, it might be about a future Holocaust of the human species. "I began to address all my repressed  fears, about earth and mankind. Abusing planet earth, neglect, pollution - all these found expression in these later works of mine", he said. However, many of his paintings are of narrative style, telling an unknown story, in a style often recognized as "Holocaust Art" in Israeli society. Israeli art critic Gideon Efrat called this style of paintings literary paintings  
 
Whether they are drowning, standing in murky water or in a destroyed environment, Levy's figures from that period are helpless. Such is the painting  "After despair" where people stand surrounded by water where no land is to be seen  in the background, and the looks on their faces says terror and fear. Such is the painting "The Breaker" where people are fleeing a large scale wave as in a tsunami. The painting "Remains", also from that series, depicts an environment where humans are gone, and only rubber tires and destroyed buildings can be seen. Other works include elements of fire, which have been attributed to Holocaust art.

Other works from that series are aluminium sculptures of a semi-insects semi aliens that prosper in a "post-human environment". Regarding these sculptures Levy said that he had "created a breed of large insects, with all sorts of skills, a race more resistant and adapting than human beings. After the human extinction they are the ones to be restoring the world, and therefore their genitals are emphasized, as reproduction is grave."

The paintings and sculptures from that period were critiqued as "disturbing". Levy explained that he did not wish to create pleasant images: "My job as an artist is to warn humanity. We must act differently in this world if we want to avoid such a future".

Today Levy keeps working extensively, though only a limited number of hours each day due to his age, in his studio in the industrial area Talpiyot in Jerusalem.

References

Bibliography
 Broutin, Batya. Memory of the Holocaust in Israeli Art (in Hebrew)
 Hana Yablonka, "Other Aspects of Silence", Published by Yad VaShem, (in Hebrew).
 Ziva Amishai-Maisels, "Depiction & Interpretation: The Influence of the Holocaust on the Visual Arts", Pergamon Press, Oxford 1993.

Israeli artists
German emigrants to Mandatory Palestine
1927 births
Living people
People from Hadera
People from Jerusalem